I Dared to Live is a book about the Holocaust written by Sandra Brand. It tells her story, under the name Roma Brand. Roma obtains fake papers in order to pretend to be a Christian woman called Cecylia Szarek. Although she loses her husband and only child, Bruno, she does survive the war and moves to the United States.

References

1978 books
Personal accounts of the Holocaust